Rocket Robo is an iOS and Android game by British indie developer Aaron McElligott and released on 30 January 2014.

Critical reception
The game has a Metacritic score of 85% based on 4 critic reviews.

Touch Arcade wrote, "Rocket Robo is worth picking up for its presentation alone. The design is stellar, to the point where I could easily see figures of Robo selling at a local store. But it's more than just a pretty picture, as it's complemented by tight controls and engaging gameplay." 148Apps said, "Rocket ROBO's combination of whimsical graphics and impeccable gameplay is just stellar." Pocket Gamer UK wrote, "Rocket Robo is a charming and attractive casual puzzler in which its maker fleshes out its basic concept with solid controls and varied level design." Apple'N'Apps said, "Rocket Robo reaches for the stars with well designed puzzle platforming experience that is a should buy."

References

2014 video games
Android (operating system) games
IOS games
Puzzle video games
Video games developed in the United Kingdom